Július Bielik (born 8 March 1962) is a former Slovak football player. He played for Sparta Prague in Czechoslovakia and Sanfrecce Hiroshima in Japan. He played for the Czechoslovakia national team 18 times and was a participant at the 1990 FIFA World Cup.

He later coached FK Viktoria Žižkov and FK Jablonec.

Club statistics

National team statistics

References

External links
 Profile at ČMFS website
 

 

1962 births
Living people
Sportspeople from Trnava
Association football defenders
Slovak footballers
FC Spartak Trnava players
Czech First League players
AC Sparta Prague players
FK Hvězda Cheb players
FC Hradec Králové players
Japan Soccer League players
J1 League players
Sanfrecce Hiroshima players
Expatriate footballers in Japan
Czechoslovak footballers
1990 FIFA World Cup players
Czechoslovakia international footballers
Slovak football managers
Czechoslovak expatriate footballers
Czechoslovak expatriate sportspeople in Japan
FK Viktoria Žižkov managers
FK Jablonec managers
People from Vyškov
Sportspeople from the South Moravian Region